A huissier de justice (literally French for "justice usher"), sometimes anglicized as judicial officer, is an officer of the court in France and Belgium, and  The officer is appointed by a magistrate of the court (or in France, by the Minister of Justice) and holds a monopoly on the service and execution of court decisions and enforceable instruments. Huissiers de justice also serve as formal witnesses to events (constat d'huissier) in the manner of a notary public. 

In their role as a member of the legal profession they are authorized to serve process, and as such are responsible for delivering legal documents and authenticating the parties to whom they are delivered; proceed in the enforcement and recovery of any court and legal claims, including bankruptcy, property claims, seizures, and evictions; issue court summonses (assignments and quotations); and perform other actions. They may also exercise authorizations of a Court of Appeals, and act in insurance and property actions. Further, they have the sole right to call police hearings to guarantee execution of court orders, and to conduct other activities such as amicable settlements, draft findings of private deeds, and offer limited legal advice. They are authorized to authenticate character findings, which may serve as evidence during litigation. Some elements of their statements cannot be challenged except by way of improbation.

References

External links
 International Union of Judicial Officers
 Huissiers de Justice 
 Chambre des huissiers de justice du Grand-Duché de Luxembourg  
 Koninklijke Beroepsorganisatie van Gerechtsdeurwaarders 
 Nationale Kamer van Gerechtsdeurwaarders (Belgium) 
 Conferentie Vlaamse Gerechtsdeurwaarders (Flanders) 
 la Chambre des huissiers de justice du Québec 
  (pdf) Handbook of the Hague Service Convention — explains the difference between signification and notification in legal systems based on the Napoleonic Code
 Definitions of French legal system roles
 Qualification

Law of France
Region-specific legal occupations